Azerbaijan competed at the 2020 Summer Olympics in Tokyo. Originally scheduled to take place from 24 July to 9 August 2020, the Games were postponed to 23 July to 8 August 2021, because of the COVID-19 pandemic. It was the nation's seventh consecutive appearance at the Summer Olympics in the post-Soviet era.

Medalists

Competitors
The following is the list of number of competitors participating in the Games:

Athletics
 
Azerbaijani athletes further achieved the entry standards, either by qualifying time or by world ranking, in the following track and field events (up to a maximum of 3 athletes in each event):

Field events

Badminton

Azerbaijan entered one badminton player into the Olympic tournament. Indonesian-born Ade Resky Dwicahyo secured the men's singles spot based on the BWF Race to Tokyo Rankings. This is for the first time, Azerbaijan will be represented in badminton at the Summer Olympics.

Boxing

Azerbaijan entered one male boxer into the Olympic tournament. Fourth-seeded Tayfur Aliyev scored a round-of-16 victory to secure a spot in the men's featherweight division at the 2020 European Qualification Tournament in London, United Kingdom.

Cycling

Road
Azerbaijan entered one rider to compete in the men's Olympic road race, by virtue of his top 50 national finish (for men) in the UCI World Ranking.

Fencing

Azerbaijan entered one fencer into the Olympic competition. Anna Bashta claimed a spot in the women's sabre by winning the final match at the European Zonal Qualifier in Madrid, Spain.

Gymnastics

Artistic
Azerbaijan entered two artistic gymnasts into the Olympic competition. İvan Tixonov  and Marina Nekrasova received a spare berth each from the men's and women's apparatus events, respectively, as one of the highest-ranked gymnasts, neither part of the team nor qualified directly through the all-around, at the 2019 World Championships in Stuttgart, Germany.

Men

Women

Rhythmic 
Azerbaijan qualified a squad of rhythmic gymnasts for the individual and group all-around by finishing in the top 16 (for individual) and top 5 (for group), respectively, at the 2019 World Championships in Baku. Zohra Aghamirova was announced as the individual on 27 June 2021.

Judo
 
Azerbaijan entered eight judoka (seven men and one women) into the Olympic tournament based on the International Judo Federation Olympics Individual Ranking.

Men

Women

Karate
 
Azerbaijan entered two karateka into the inaugural Olympic tournament. World champions Rafael Aghayev (men's 75 kg) and Irina Zaretska (women's +61 kg) qualified directly for their respective kumite categories by finishing among the top four karateka at the end of the combined WKF Olympic Rankings.

Kumite

Shooting

Azerbaijani shooters achieved quota places for the following events by virtue of their best finishes at the 2018 ISSF World Championships, the 2019 ISSF World Cup series, European Championships or Games, and European Qualifying Tournament, as long as they obtained a minimum qualifying score (MQS) by May 31, 2020.

Swimming 

Azerbaijani swimmers further achieved qualifying standards in the following events (up to a maximum of 2 swimmers in each event at the Olympic Qualifying Time (OQT), and potentially 1 at the Olympic Selection Time (OST)):

Taekwondo

Azerbaijan entered two athletes into the taekwondo competition at the Games. Rio 2016 Olympian Milad Beigi qualified directly for the second time in the men's welterweight category (80 kg) by finishing among the top five taekwondo practitioners at the end of the WT Olympic Rankings. Meanwhile, two-time Olympian Farida Azizova scored a semifinal victory in the women's welterweight category (67 kg) to book the remaining spot on the Azerbaijani taekwondo squad at the 2021 European Qualification Tournament in Sofia, Bulgaria.

Triathlon

Individual

Wrestling

Azerbaijan qualified seven wrestlers for each of the following weight classes into the Olympic competition. Two of them finished among the top six to book Olympic spots in the men's freestyle 97 kg and women's freestyle 50 kg at the 2019 World Championships, while three additional licenses were awarded to the Azerbaijani wrestlers, who progressed to the top two finals of their respective weight categories at the 2021 European Olympic Qualification Tournament in Budapest, Hungary. Two Azerbaijani wrestlers claimed one of the remaining slots each in the men's Greco-Roman 77 kg and women's freestyle 68 kg, respectively to complete the nation's roster at the 2021 World Qualification Tournament in Sofia, Bulgaria.

Freestyle

Greco-Roman

See also
 Azerbaijan at the 2020 Summer Paralympics

References

External links 

Nations at the 2020 Summer Olympics
2020
2021 in Azerbaijani sport